Uraninite, formerly pitchblende, is a radioactive, uranium-rich mineral and ore with a chemical composition that is largely UO2 but because of oxidation typically contains variable proportions of U3O8. Radioactive decay of the uranium causes the mineral to contain oxides of lead and trace amounts of helium. It may also contain thorium and rare-earth elements.

Overview
Uraninite used to be known as pitchblende (from pitch, because of its black color, and blende, from blenden meaning "to deceive", a term used by German miners to denote minerals whose density suggested metal content, but whose exploitation, at the time they were named, was either unknown or not economically feasible). The mineral has been known at least since the 15th century from silver mines in the Ore Mountains, on the German/Czech border. The type locality is the historic mining and spa town known as Joachimsthal, the modern day Jáchymov, on the Czech side of the mountains, where F. E. Brückmann described the mineral in 1772. Pitchblende from the Johanngeorgenstadt deposit in Germany was used by M. Klaproth in 1789 to discover the element uranium.

All uraninite minerals contain a small amount of radium as a radioactive decay product of uranium. Marie Curie used pitchblende, processing tons of it herself, as the source material for her isolation of radium in 1910.

Uraninite also always contains small amounts of the lead isotopes 206Pb and 207Pb, the end products of the decay series of the uranium isotopes 238U and 235U respectively. Small amounts of helium are also present in uraninite as a result of alpha decay. Helium was first found on Earth in cleveite, an impure radioactive variety of uraninite, after having been discovered spectroscopically in the Sun's atmosphere. The extremely rare elements technetium and promethium can be found in uraninite in very small quantities (about 200 pg/kg and 4 fg/kg respectively), produced by the spontaneous fission of uranium-238. Francium can also be found in uraninite at 1 francium atom for every 1 × 1018 uranium atoms in the ore as a result from the decay of actinium.

Occurrence

Uraninite is a major ore of uranium. Some of the highest-grade uranium ores in the world were found in the Shinkolobwe mine in the Democratic Republic of the Congo (the initial source for the Manhattan Project) and in the Athabasca Basin in northern Saskatchewan, Canada.  Another important source of pitchblende is at Great Bear Lake in the Northwest Territories of Canada, where it is found in large quantities associated with silver. It also occurs in Australia, the Czech Republic, Germany, England, Rwanda, Namibia and South Africa. In the United States, it can be found in the states of Arizona, Colorado, Connecticut, Maine, New Hampshire, New Mexico, North Carolina and Wyoming. The geologist Charles Steen made a fortune on the production of uraninite in his Mi Vida mine in Moab, Utah. Uranium ores from the Ore Mountains (today the border between the Czech Republic and Germany) were an important supply of both the wartime German nuclear program (which failed to produce a bomb) and the Soviet nuclear program. Mining for uranium in the Ore Mountains (under the auspices of SDAG Wismut after the war) ceased after the collapse of the German Democratic Republic.

Uranium ore is generally processed close to the mine into yellowcake, which is an intermediate step in the processing of uranium.

See also
 List of minerals
 List of uranium mines
 Thorianite
 Uranium ore deposits

References

External links 
 

Cubic minerals
Minerals in space group 225
Oxide minerals
Radioactive minerals
Uranium(IV) minerals